Salem Municipal Airport  is a city-owned, public-use airport located two nautical miles (4 km) west of the central business district of Salem, a city in Washington County, Indiana, United States. It is included in the National Plan of Integrated Airport Systems for 2011–2015, which categorized it as a general aviation facility.

Facilities and aircraft 
Salem Municipal Airport covers an area of 47 acres (19 ha) at an elevation of 822 feet (251 m) above mean sea level. It has one runway designated 10/28 with an asphalt surface measuring 2,738 by 50 feet (835 x 15 m).

For the 12-month period ending December 31, 2009, the airport had 7,838 aircraft operations, an average of 21 per day: 99.9% general aviation, <1% air taxi, and <1% military. At that time there were 41 aircraft based at this airport: 95% single-engine, 2% helicopter, and 2% ultralight.

References

External links 
 Airport page at City of Salem website
 
 Aerial image as of March 1998 from USGS The National Map
 

Airports in Indiana
Transportation buildings and structures in Washington County, Indiana